Juquiá is a municipality in the state of São Paulo in Brazil. The population is 18,718 (2020 est.) in an area of 813 km². The elevation is 17 m.

The municipality contains part of the  Serra do Mar Environmental Protection Area, created in 1984.

References

Municipalities in São Paulo (state)